Shri Shiv Chhatrapati College (SSC College) is a degree college in western India, situated in the city of Junnar in Pune district.

SSC was founded in 1970 by Junnar Taluka Shivner Shikshan Prasarak Mandal. The college was founded under the academic leadership of economist Hon. Shri Govardhandas Parikh, then rector at Bombay University. Since 1970, the college has been under the jurisdiction of the University of Pune. The college has two sections: a junior wing and a senior wing. At the end of their courses, students may appeal for the Higher-Secondary State Certificate examination. The  campus of the college is located in the city. It is the location of the athletic and cultural facilities, as well as the residential facilities.

References

Education in Pune district